These places are in Ireland.
Belmullet
Bangor Erris
Doohoma
Doolough
Geesala
Pollathomas
Barroosky
Aughleam
Glenamoy
Glengad
Rossport
Inver
Barnatra
Carrowteige
Cill Ghallagáin
Erris Head
Mullet Peninsula
Bellacorick
Benwee Head
Porturlin
Portacloy
Carrowmore Lake
Glencullen, County Mayo
Glenamoy
Ballycroy National Park
Nephin
Broadhaven Bay
Blacksod Bay

Baronies of County Mayo